Lisa Frankenstein is an upcoming American horror comedy film written by Diablo Cody and directed by Zelda Williams in her feature-length directorial debut.  The film stars Kathryn Newton, Cole Sprouse, and Carla Gugino in the lead roles, and is set to be released by Focus Features. Some of the scenes from the classes are filmed at Belle Chasse High School.

Premise 
In 1989, during a lightning storm, an unpopular high school girl named Lisa accidentally re-animates a handsome Victorian corpse. She then tries transforming him into the man of her dreams by using a broken tanning bed in her garage.

Cast 
 Kathryn Newton as Lisa Frankenstein
 Cole Sprouse
 Carla Gugino
 Liza Soberano as Taffy
 Joe Chrest
 Henry Eikenberry
 Jenna Davis as Lori

Production 
Diablo Cody wrote the script for Lisa Frankenstein, and she announced that she would be producing the film with collaborator Mason Novick in June 2022. Zelda Williams makes her feature-length debut as the director of the film starring Kathryn Newton and Cole Sprouse. Further casting announcements of Liza Soberano, Carla Gugino, Joe Chrest, and Henry Eikenberry were also unveiled in August 2022, around the time when production began filming in New Orleans which was expected to run until September.

References

External links 
 

2020s comedy horror films
American comedy horror films
Films shot in New Orleans
Films with screenplays by Diablo Cody
Focus Features films
Frankenstein films
Upcoming directorial debut films